Elizabeth Klinck is a visual researcher and clearance specialist in the Canadian and international documentary film industry. Some of the notable projects she has worked on include Werner Herzog's Into the Inferno, Thorsten Schütte's Eat That Question: Frank Zappa in His Own Words, Barry Arvich's Quality Balls: The David Steinberg Story, Sarah Polley's Stories We Tell, Hrund Gunnsteinsdottir's Innsaei and Neil Diamond's Reel Injun.

She was nominated for an Emmy Award in the craft of research, and three times for Best Visual Researcher at the FOCAL Awards in the United Kingdom. She has also won the 2014, 2015 and 2017 Barbara Sears Award for Best Visual Research from the Canadian Screen Awards. In 2021, Elizabeth won her fourth Barbara Sears Award for her work on Cheating Hitler: Surviving the Holocaust. In 2015 she won a Prix Gemeaux for her work on Apocalypse World One and in 2010 she won a Gemini for Best Visual Research for her work on Reel Injun.  She has also won a Yorkton Golden Sheaf award and was honored with the FOCAL International Lifetime Achievement Award in 2008.  She is the founding chairperson of the Visual Researchers' Society of Canada.

Awards

Nominations

References

External links
 

Canadian women in film
Living people
Year of birth missing (living people)
Canadian Screen Award winners